Swadesh may refer to

 Swadesh list, named after its creator Morris Swadesh
 Swadesh News, a Hindi-language news television channel
 Swades, a 2004 Hindi film

People 
 Morris Swadesh (1909–1967), American linguist
 Swadesh Bharati (born 1939), Award winning Hindi poet
 Swadesh Bose (1928–2009), Bangladeshi economist and Liberation War organiser
 Swadesh Chakraborty (born 1943), Indian politician
 Swadesh Deepak (born 1942), Indian playwright, novelist and short-story writer

See also
 Swadeshi